The 1976 United States presidential election in Indiana was held on November 2, 1976. Incumbent President Gerald Ford won the state of Indiana with 53% of the vote, carrying the state's 13 electoral votes. He defeated Democratic candidate Jimmy Carter in Indiana by a margin of 7.62 points.

Ford won Indiana by a comfortable margin of 7.62%, making the state almost 10% more Republican than the nation at-large. Carter did, however, perform vastly better than George McGovern's performance in the previous election. Ford did well in the central and northern parts of the state, while Carter managed to keep the margin in the single digits by winning most of Southern Indiana. Vigo County, a national bellwether and home to Terre Haute, had supported the winner of the electoral college in all but two elections from 1888 to 2020, maintained its streak, voting for Carter by 2.3 percentage points, a similar margin to the nation as a whole.

, this is the last election in which Dearborn County, Dubois County, Martin County, Ohio County, and Owen County voted for a Democratic presidential candidate, and the last in which St. Joseph County did not vote for the national popular vote winner. This also remains the last time that Indiana has voted for a different candidate than North Carolina in a presidential election.

Results

Results by county

Hillary Clinton’s role in the Carter campaign
One of the Carter campaign's state organizers in Indiana was Hillary Rodham. Rodham (who would later adopt her husband's surname of Clinton) would go on to serve as a First Lady, Senator, and Secretary of State. Forty years later, during her turn as the Democratic nominee for president, Carter gave a speech in support of her candidacy saying, "During my 1976 presidential run, a young woman moved to Indianapolis to help turn out the Indiana vote for me. Forty years later, I will proudly cast my vote for that same woman to be the next President of the United States."

See also
 United States presidential elections in Indiana

References

1976
Indiana
1976 Indiana elections
United States